Gisilia conformata is a moth in the family Cosmopterigidae. It is found in Kenya, Namibia and South Africa.

This species has a wingspan of 8 mm, its forewings are whitish-grey-ochreous speckled with black.

References

Moths described in 1921
Chrysopeleiinae
Moths of Africa